Aeolochroma pammiges is a moth of the family Geometridae first described by Alfred Jefferis Turner in 1941. It is found in Queensland, Australia.

References

Moths described in 1941
Pseudoterpnini
Moths of Australia